Bishop Island is a Baffin Island offshore island located in the Arctic Archipelago in the territory of Nunavut. Hill Island and Faris Island are in the immediate vicinity.

The island was named by American Arctic explorer Charles Francis Hall.

References 

Islands of Baffin Island
Uninhabited islands of Qikiqtaaluk Region
Islands of Frobisher Bay